Phyllotreta cruciferae, known generally as crucifer flea beetle, is a species of flea beetle in the family Chrysomelidae. Other common names include the canola flea beetle and rape flea beetle. It is found in Europe and Northern Asia (excluding China) and North America.

References

Further reading

External links

 

Alticini
Articles created by Qbugbot
Beetles described in 1777